Farrea occa is a species of glass sponge in the family Farreidae.

References

Hexactinellida
Animals described in 1862